Brandon Tyler Cumpton (born November 16, 1988) is an American former professional baseball pitcher. He was selected by the Pittsburgh Pirates in the 9th round of the 2010 Major League Baseball draft and made his MLB debut for them in 2013. He attended the Georgia Institute of Technology (Georgia Tech), where he pitched for the Yellow Jackets. Cumpton also played for the Toronto Blue Jays.

Amateur career
Cumpton attended Greenbrier High School in Evans, Georgia, and the Georgia Institute of Technology (Georgia Tech), where he played college baseball for the Georgia Tech Yellow Jackets baseball team. In 2008 and 2009, he played collegiate summer baseball with the Cotuit Kettleers of the Cape Cod Baseball League.

Professional career

Pittsburgh Pirates
The Pittsburgh Pirates selected Cumpton in the ninth round of the 2010 Major League Baseball Draft.

Cumpton's first call up to the major leagues came on June 15, 2013. He replaced the injured A. J. Burnett. In his major league debut that day, Cumpton pitched five innings (facing three batters in the sixth), allowing three earned runs and seven hits in a no decision against the Los Angeles Dodgers.

Despite a strong spring training, Cumpton started the 2014 season pitching for the Indianapolis Indians. On April 23, Cumpton was called up to replace the injured Wandy Rodríguez in the Pirates rotation. Cumpton made his first start of the 2014 season on April 24, giving up two earned runs on four hits in seven innings, earning the loss after receiving only one run of support in a 2–1 loss to the Cincinnati Reds. Cumpton recorded his first career hit on May 26, 2014, during an away game against the New York Mets. On May 31, Cumpton faced the team he made his Major League debut against, the Los Angeles Dodgers. Cumpton, ultimately, had his worst start to date, allowing ten earned runs  in 3 2/3 innings pitched. His next two starts resulted in wins on June 6 and June 11 against the Milwaukee Brewers and Chicago Cubs, respectively.

Cumpton suffered a torn UCL during 2015 spring training, which necessitated Tommy John surgery. He officially underwent the procedure on March 10, 2015, and was unable to participate for the entire 2015 season. The surgery was performed by Dr. James Andrews. He elected free agency on November 6, 2017.

Texas Rangers
On January 5, 2018, Cumpton signed a minor league contract that included an invite to spring training with the Texas Rangers. He was released on March 20, 2018.

Southern Maryland Blue Crabs
On April 18, 2018, Cumpton signed with the Southern Maryland Blue Crabs of the Atlantic League of Professional Baseball.

Toronto Blue Jays
On July 4, 2018, Cumpton signed a minor league deal with the Toronto Blue Jays and was assigned to the Triple-A Buffalo Bisons. Cumpton was called up to the majors on July 31.  He was designated for assignment on August 13, and then assigned back to Buffalo on August 16. Cumpton declared free agency on October 5, 2018.

Return to Southern Maryland
On April 18, 2019, Cumpton signed with the Southern Maryland Blue Crabs of the Atlantic League of Professional Baseball.

Pericos de Puebla
On July 24, 2019, Cumpton's contract was purchased by the Pericos de Puebla of the Mexican League. He was released on October 3, 2019.

Diablos Rojos del México 
On January 16, 2020, Cumpton signed with the Diablos Rojos del México of the Mexican League.

Winnipeg Goldeyes
On July 23, 2020, Cumpton signed with the Winnipeg Goldeyes of the American Association of Independent Professional Baseball.

Second stint with Diablos Rojos del Mexico
On September 11, 2020, Cumpton was returned to the Diablos. He began the 2021 season with the team, but struggled to a 8.55 ERA in 5 appearances.

Guerreros de Oaxaca
On June 14, 2021, Cumpton was traded to the Guerreros de Oaxaca of the Mexican League in exchange for P Héctor Hernández. He was released on November 23, 2021. This was Cumpton's final stint in professional baseball.

References

External links

Georgia Tech Yellow Jackets bio

1988 births
Living people
Altoona Curve players
American expatriate baseball players in Canada
American expatriate baseball players in Mexico
Baseball players from Georgia (U.S. state)
Bradenton Marauders players
Buffalo Bisons (minor league) players
Cotuit Kettleers players
Diablos Rojos del México players
Georgia Tech Yellow Jackets baseball players
Indianapolis Indians players
Major League Baseball pitchers
Mexican League baseball pitchers
People from Evans, Georgia
Pericos de Puebla players
Pittsburgh Pirates players
Scottsdale Scorpions players
Southern Maryland Blue Crabs players
State College Spikes players
Toronto Blue Jays players
Toros del Este players
American expatriate baseball players in the Dominican Republic
West Virginia Power players
Winnipeg Goldeyes players
Yaquis de Obregón players